Qannir was a Palestinian village, located 35 kilometers south of Haifa. With 750 inhabitants in 1945, it was depopulated in the lead up to the 1948 Arab-Israeli war.

History
In the late Ottoman era, Qannir appears on sheet 45 of Jacotin's map drawn-up during Napoleon's invasion in 1799.

In 1859, the English consul Rogers estimated the population to be 250, who cultivated 24 feddans of land. By  1882,  PEF's Survey of Western Palestine described the place as a village of  adobe of moderate size, with one well to the south, and another to the west. By a later account, the village consisted of stone houses built side by side.

A population list from about 1887 showed that  el Kannir had about 665 inhabitants, all Muslim.

British Mandate era
In the 1922 census of Palestine, conducted by the  British Mandate authorities,  Qannir had a population of 400; all Muslims, increasing slightly in the 1931 census  to 483, still all Muslims,  in  a total of  92 houses.

In the  1945 statistics the population was 750 Muslims with 10,826 dunums of land. Of this, a total of 5,760 dunums were  used for cereals; while 460 dunums were irrigated or used for orchards, while 22 dunams were built-up (urban) land.

1948, and after
Between 22–24 April 1948, the women and children of Qannir started to evacuate the village, apparently on [Arab] "orders from on high".

According to a dispatch sent by Fawzi al-Qawuqji to the [Arab] High Command, an enemy attack from Ein Hashofeit started on 0400 on 8 May towards Quannir and Kafr Quari. The attackers were supported by armored cars. According to al-Qawuqji the attack was "resisted and repelled", with a result of one killed and four wounded on the Palestinian side.

However, according to Haganah sources, the forces of the Alexandroni Brigade "raided the village on 9 May 1948, killed four Arabs and blew up 55 houses". According to Morris, the remaining villagers probably left at this time. Following the war the area was incorporated into the State of Israel, with the kibbutz of Regavim established on the village's former lands in 1949.

Khalidi described the place in 1992: Stone rubble is strewn about the site, which is covered with thorns, fig trees, and cactus. Part of the adjacent land is used by Israelis as pasture and the other part is cultivated.

References

Bibliography

  
   

  
 
 

  
al-Qawuqji, F. (1972): Memoirs of al-Qawuqji, Fauzi in Journal of Palestine Studies 
"Memoirs, 1948, Part I" in 1, no. 4 (Sum. 72): 27-58., dpf-file, downloadable
"Memoirs, 1948, Part II" in 2, no. 1 (Aut. 72): 3-33., dpf-file, downloadable

External links
Welcome To Qannir
 Qannir, Zochrot
Survey of Western Palestine, Map 8: IAA,  Wikimedia commons
Qannir from the Khalil Sakakini Cultural Center

Arab villages depopulated prior to the 1948 Arab–Israeli War
District of Haifa